Eastie may refer to:

 Eastie, a nickname for East Boston, Boston, Massachusetts, United States
 Eastie, someone from Essex, England, UK; see List of British regional nicknames
 Isaac Eastie (1627-1712) husband of Mary Eastie, an accused witch burned at the Salem Witch Trials
 Mary Eastie (1634-1692) an accused witch burned at the Salem Witch Trials

See also
 Easty
 Estey (disambiguation)